EVMS may refer to:
 Eastern Virginia Medical School, a public medical school in Norfolk, Virginia
 Enterprise Volume Management System, an integrated volume management software
 Earned value management system, implementation for determining  projects' earned value

See also 
 EVM (disambiguation)